Opostegoides is a genus of moths of the family Opostegidae.

Species
Opostegoides albellus Sinev, 1990
Opostegoides argentisoma Puplesis & Robinson, 1999
Opostegoides auriptera Puplesis & Robinson, 1999
Opostegoides bicolorella Sinev, 1990
Opostegoides cameroni Puplesis & Robinson, 1999
Opostegoides epistolaris (Meyrick, 1911)
Opostegoides flavimacula Puplesis & Robinson, 1999 
Opostegoides gephyraea (Meyrick, 1881)
Opostegoides gorgonea Puplesis & Robinson, 1999 
Opostegoides index Meyrick, 1922
Opostegoides longipedicella Puplesis & Robinson, 1999
Opostegoides malaysiensis D.R. Davis, 1989
Opostegoides menthinella (Mann, 1855)
Opostegoides minodensis (Kuroko, 1982)
Opostegoides nephelozona (Meyrick, 1915)
Opostegoides omelkoi Kozlov, 1985
Opostegoides padiensis Sinev, 1990
Opostegoides pelorrhoa (Meyrick, 1915)
Opostegoides scioterma (Meyrick, 1920)
Opostegoides sinevi Kozlov, 1985
Opostegoides spinifera Puplesis & Robinson, 1999
Opostegoides tetroa (Meyrick, 1907)
Opostegoides thailandica Puplesis & Robinson, 1999
Opostegoides uvida (Meyrick, 1915)

External links
Generic Revision of the Opostegidae, with a Synoptic Catalog of the World's Species (Lepidoptera: Nepticuloidea)

Opostegidae
Monotrysia genera